Düsseldorf-Unterrath is a railway station situated at Unterrath, Düsseldorf in western Germany. It is served by Rhine-Ruhr S-Bahn lines S 1 (Dortmund–Solingen) every 30 minutes and S 11 (Düsseldorf Airport Terminal–Bergisch Gladbach) every 20 minutes.

Notes

Railway stations in Düsseldorf
S1 (Rhine-Ruhr S-Bahn)
S11 (Rhine-Ruhr S-Bahn)
Rhine-Ruhr S-Bahn stations
Railway stations in Germany opened in 1880